The Pine Tier Dam is a gravity dam built in Tasmania, Australia in 1953. It has a height of 40 metres and a crest length of 195 metres. The total volume of the dam wall is 77,000 cubic metres.

See also

List of reservoirs and dams in Tasmania

References

Hydro Tasmania dams
Dams completed in 1953
Gravity dams